Honner may refer to:

Honner Township, Redwood County, Minnesota, United States
John St. George Honner, an American farmer and politician
Maria Honner, an Irish actress
Ralph Honner, an Australian soldier
Robert William Honner, an English actor